Jennifer Gadirova (born 3 October 2004) is an English artistic gymnast of Irish birth and Azerbaijani descent, representing Great Britain internationally. She represented Great Britain at the 2020 Summer Olympics and won a bronze medal in the team event, and was part of the Great Britain team to win silver, their best ever result, in the team event at the 2022 World Artistic Gymnastics Championships and the same medal at the 2022 European Championships. Competing at the 2019 Junior World Championships, she won a silver medal in the vault final. 

Jennifer Gadirova is the twin sister and teammate of the 2022 World Champion on floor exercise, Jessica Gadirova.

Personal life 
Gadirova and her twin sister Jessica were born in Dublin, Ireland, and are of Azerbaijani background. Their father, Natig Gadirov, is a citizen of Azerbaijan and their mother is Azerbaijani as well.  Gadirova was born in Dublin while her parents worked there for a few months; as a result she has Azeri, Irish and British citizenships. Her paternal grandparents live in Baku: grandmother is a retired paediatrician, and grandfather is a professor in physics and mathematics. Gadirova and her sister began gymnastics at six years old because their mother wanted them to have an outlet for their energy.

Gymnastics career

Espoir

2016 
In March, Gadirova competed at the English Championships, where she placed first on floor exercise, winning the Christine Bowker Artistry Trophy, and fourth in the all-around.

Junior

2018 
In February, Gadirova competed at the English Championships, where she placed twelfth. The following month, she competed at the British Championships, where she placed fifth on floor exercise, sixth on vault, and nineteenth in the all-around.  She ended the season competing at the British Team Championships, where she placed third in the junior non-squad all-around.

2019 
In March, Gadirova competed at the English Championships, where she placed third behind Ondine Achampong and Halle Hilton.  Later that month she competed at the British Championships where she placed fifth in the all-around and won gold on floor exercise, silver on vault, behind Annie Young, and bronze on uneven bars, behind Achampong and Young.

In June, Gadirova competed at the inaugural Junior World Championships in Győr, Hungary alongside her twin sister Jessica and Alia Leat. In the team final they finished in sixth place and individually Gadirova finished seventh in the all-around.  During event finals she won silver on vault with a score of 14.133 behind American Kayla DiCello, finished fourth on floor exercise (13.266) and sixth on balance beam (13.133). Gadirova was the first British gymnast to win a medal at the Junior World Championships.

In July Gadirova competed at the Sainté Gym Cup, where she helped Great Britain win team gold.  In September, she competed at the 2019 Women’s Artistic Adrian Stan British Teams Championships, finishing second in the junior all-around, after her sister. In November she competed at the Massilia Cup in France, winning gold on vault and silver on floor.

Senior

2020 
In 2020 Gadirova became a senior; her senior debut was the American Cup where she replaced injured Amelie Morgan. She placed fourth (due to a fall) behind Morgan Hurd, Kayla DiCello (both from the United States), and Hitomi Hatakeda of Japan.  While there, she received the highest score on floor exercise (13.700) and vault (14.566), second highest on balance beam (13.933), and tenth highest on uneven bars.

2021
In April, Gadirova was selected to represent Great Britain at the European Championships alongside her twin sister Jessica, Alice Kinsella, and Amelie Morgan.  Later that month she withdrew as a precaution due to a minor injury and was replaced by Phoebe Jakubczyk.

On 7 June, Gadirova was selected to represent Great Britain at the 2020 Summer Olympics, alongside her twin sister Jessica, Alice Kinsella, and Amelie Morgan.  At the Olympic Games, Gadirova qualified for the all-around final; additionally Great Britain qualified for the team final.  During the team final, Gadirova performed on vault, balance beam, and floor exercise, hitting all of her routines and helping Great Britain win the bronze medal, their first Olympic team medal in 93 years.  During the all-around final, Gadirova had some minor issues on the uneven bars but still finished 13th place overall.  Originally Gadirova was the first reserve for the floor exercise final and she was able to compete after Simone Biles withdrew.  During the floor exercise event final, Gadirova finished in seventh place.

In December 2021 Gadirova became a brand ambassador for gymnastics leotard manufacturer Milano Pro-Sport

2022
In March, Gadirova competed at the English Championships where she placed third on bars and second on floor. 

Later that month, Gadirova competed at the British Championships in Liverpool where she won bronze in the all-around with a score of 52.350, placing behind her Aylesbury teammates Jessica Gadirova and Ondine Achampong.  She then went on to win bronze on the uneven bars, gold on beam and silver on floor in the apparatus finals.   In July Gadirova was selected to compete at the European Championships alongside her sister Jessica, Achampong, Georgia-Mae Fenton, and Alice Kinsella.  While there she contributed scores on balance beam and floor exercise towards Great Britain's second place finish.  During event finals Gadirova placed fifth on floor exercise.

In September Gadirova competed at the Paris World Challenge Cup.  She qualified to the balance beam and floor exercise finals.  She won bronze on floor exercise behind Americans Jordan Chiles and Shilese Jones and placed fourth on balance beam.  Later that month Gadirova was named to the team to compete at the 2022 World Championships, once again alongside her twin sister Jessica, Achampong, Kinsella, and Fenton.  Gadirova qualified to the floor exercise final and helped Great Britain qualify to the team final.  During the team final Gadirova competed on floor exercise, helping Great Britain win the silver medal and achieve their highest placement at a World Championships.

Selected competitive skills

Competitive history

References

2004 births
British people of Azerbaijani descent
Irish people of Azerbaijani descent
Azerbaijani gymnasts
Irish gymnasts
British female artistic gymnasts
Living people
Medalists at the Junior World Artistic Gymnastics Championships
Twin sportspeople
English twins
Irish twins
Gymnasts at the 2020 Summer Olympics
Olympic gymnasts of Great Britain
Olympic medalists in gymnastics
Olympic bronze medallists for Great Britain
Olympic athletes of Great Britain
Medalists at the World Artistic Gymnastics Championships
Medalists at the 2020 Summer Olympics
People from Aylesbury
Sportspeople from Dublin (city)